Thomas Lipscomb was a college football player.

Vanderbilt
Lipscomb was a prominent tackle and guard for Dan McGugin's Vanderbilt Commodores football teams, playing opposite Josh Cody.

1915
He and Cody blocked a punt in the game against Sewanee for the Southern Intercollegiate Athletic Association (SIAA) championship in 1915.

1919
In the game against SIAA champion Auburn in 1919, he and Frank Goar were sent in on Auburn's last drive. Goar had been sick and Lipscomb was suffering from an injured ankle. The two spurned the team to victory in what the yearbook called "the greatest defensive stand ever staged by any Vanderbilt team." It was Auburn's only loss. Lipscomb was selected All-Southern by some writers the same year, including Zipp Newman.

References

American football tackles
American football guards
Vanderbilt Commodores football players
All-Southern college football players
Year of birth missing
Year of death missing
Place of birth missing
Place of death missing